William Gerald Dooley (May 19, 1934 – August 9, 2016) was an American football player, coach, and college athletics administrator. He served as the head coach at the University of North Carolina at Chapel Hill (1967–1977), Virginia Polytechnic Institute and State University (1978–1986), and Wake Forest University (1987–1992), compiling a career college football record of 162–126–5.

Early life and family
Dooley was born in 1934, in Mobile, Alabama. There, he attended the McGill Institute, administered by the Brothers of the Sacred Heart. Dooley then attended Perkinston Junior College in Perkinston, Mississippi from 1952 to 1953. In 1953, he moved on to Mississippi State University and graduated in 1956, where he was an all-SEC lineman for the Maroons/Bulldogs. Dooley's brother is former University of Georgia head football coach Vince Dooley, and the two went against each other's teams in the 1971 Gator Bowl. His nephew, Derek Dooley is the former head football coach at the University of Tennessee. He resided in Wilmington, North Carolina. Dooley was married to Marie Dooley. He has four sons; Jim Dooley and Billy Dooley from his first marriage to Chris Dooley and Sean Dooley and Ashton Dooley, M.S. from his second marriage to Marie Dooley.

Coaching and administrative career
With the North Carolina Tar Heels, Dooley won three Atlantic Coast Conference titles, including the school's first outright conference championship in 1971. As a result, Dooley has the most Atlantic Coast Conference titles of any North Carolina Tar Heels football coach. He left North Carolina as the winningest coach in school history, since surpassed by Dick Crum and Mack Brown. Dooley is still the school's longest consecutively tenured head coach and second longest tenured coach overall. He also achieved the school's first 11-win season in 1972. Only three other Tar Heel teams have ever won 11 games.

After his tenure at North Carolina, Dooley served as the athletic director and head football coach at Virginia Tech. He led the Hokies to three bowl games—as many as they had attended in their entire history prior to his arrival. His best team was the 1986 unit, which went 9–2–1 and won the Peach Bowl.  That team was later awarded a 10th win after Temple forfeited its entire 1986 schedule—including a 29–13 win over the Hokies—due to an ineligible player.  Thus Dooley "officially" owns Virginia Tech's first-ever 10-win season.

His tenure at Virginia Tech, however, ended shortly afterward amidst allegations of NCAA recruiting violations. After resigning from his positions at Virginia Tech, he sued the university for $3,500,000 alleging breach of contract. The lawsuit was settled out of court. At the time, he was the winningest coach in school history, though he has since been surpassed by his successor, Frank Beamer.

Finally, Dooley served as the head coach at Wake Forest where, he is fourth in the football program's history for all-time wins. Furthermore, he is tied with Paul Amen for the most Atlantic Coast Conference Coach of the Year awards in school history (2).

Awards and honors
Dooley was inducted in the Mobile Sports Hall of Fame in 1993, North Carolina Sports Hall of Fame in 1995, and the Greater Wilmington Sports Hall of Fame in 2011. The NFFCHOF Bill Dooley Chapter, located in the Raleigh-Durham area, was established in 1995 and is named in Dooley's honor.

Head coaching record

References

1934 births
2016 deaths
Georgia Bulldogs football coaches
Mississippi State Bulldogs football coaches
Mississippi State Bulldogs football players
North Carolina Tar Heels football coaches
Virginia Tech Hokies athletic directors
Virginia Tech Hokies football coaches
Wake Forest Demon Deacons football coaches
Sportspeople from Mobile, Alabama
Players of American football from Alabama